Na Maloom Afraad 2 is a 2017 Pakistani action comedy film, co-written and directed by Nabeel Qureshi and produced by Fizza Ali Meerza and Mehdi Ali. It is a sequel to Na Maloom Afraad (2014). The film stars Fahad Mustafa, Javed Sheikh, Mohsin Abbas Haider and Urwa Hocane reprising their roles from the previous film. New additions to the cast include Marina Khan and Hania Amir. While Nayyar Ejaz, Saleem Meraj and Nazr-ul-Hassan played the main antagonists.

Principal photography began in March 2017 in Karachi, and completed in May, while most shots are filmed in Cape Town. Shani Arshad has composed the film score and soundtrack. The film released on Eid al-Adha, 2 September 2017, under the banners of Filmwala Pictures and Excellency Films, and was distributed by Urdu 1.

Plot
Na Maloom Afraad 2 takes place a few years after its prequel, Farhan (Fahad Mustafa), and Shakeel bhai (Jawed Sheikh) become more destitute than they were before as they lose their multinational business. The two, along with Naina (Urwa Hocane), who is now married to Farhan, are living at a construction site and just scraping by.
It's when their pal Moon (Mohsin Abbas Haider) calls to announce his wedding and brings them to South Africa that the three are united.
The story kicks off when a Sheikh (Nayyar Ejaz) also arrives in Cape Town with his gold commode. The Sheikh stays at a grand hotel where Moon's fiance Parri (Hania Amir) works. A criminal duo (Saleem Mairaj and Nazr ul Hassan) decide to steal the gold pot and blackmail the Sheikh but when the toilet is mixed up with Parri's wedding paraphernalia and ends up with trio, hilarity ensues.

Cast
Fahad Mustafa as Farhan Ahmed
Jawed Sheikh as Shakeel Ansari
Mohsin Abbas Haider as Moon
Hania Aamir as Parri
Nayyar Ejaz as Sheikh Sultan al-Baklawa
Urwa Hocane as Naina Ahmed
Marina Khan as Sona; Parri's mother
Sohail Javed as Parri's father
Saleem Mairaj as Iqbal
Nazr-ul-Hassan as Thaakrey
Amber Wajid as Shama (Photo only)
Ashiq Ahmed
Annas Kashif as himself 
Micharn Pollock as Sheikh's Assistant
Benedikt Sebastian as Police officer

Special appearance 
Sadaf Kanwal (item song "Kaif o Suroor")

Production

Development
"We'd hopefully like to start working on a NMA sequel, but don't have a timeline in mind at present," producer Fizza Ali Meerza said after nine months of success of NMA in an interview with The Express Tribune, "We don't know if it's going to be a proper sequel or a spiritual successor through which we'll tell a different story this time". At the trailer launch of the film on 21 June 2017, producer said, "NMA2 is different from NMA because it's another film altogether. It's a new film that features the same characters." "Despite its connection to the previous one, NMA2 acts as a standalone film too", she added. It is director-producer-duo's third film after Na Maloom Afraad (2014) and Actor in Law (2016).

Casting
Before he flew Dubai to host PSL 2017's opening ceremony in February, Fahad Mustafa revealed to The News, "I'm working on NMAs sequel, which will be shot in South Africa". Soon, Jawed Sheikh, Mohsin Abbas Haider, Nayyar Ejaz, Saleem Meraj and Nazr-ul-Hassan joined in too. Urwa Hocane revealed in March that she has signed NMA2 as her one of the four films in the year; thus making the cast similar as was in NMA.

Hania Amir's name was revealed in April, "Ever since I saw Actor in Law I became a huge Nabeel Qureshi fan [… that] I'd love to work with this director and then a week after that I was being asked to come for NMA2." she revealed about her role in interviews with Brandsynario, The Express Tribune and Dawn Images, "[… When] I got to know that they were trying to get in touch with me so, I instantly replied and said yes to the project."

After completing the filming, the director revealed to Dawn Images that Marina Khan is also making her film debut, "she has already shot her scenes in the film, the mother of Hania Amir's character." Khan commented, "Parwaaz Hai Junoon was supposed to be my first film, since I signed it first, but NMA2 is releasing earlier so I guess this is my debut".

Sheikh shared with The News, "I absolutely love traveling", as he had to work in many films that required travelling including this film. Also, Haider told Dawn Images that he transformed his body in a six-pack look within just one-and-a-half-month for the film.

Filming
Filming began in March 2017 in Karachi. "We've shot nearly the whole film in Cape Town, South Africa, so it will be visually very interesting." said the director Nabeel Qureshi at trailer launch, "Everything you see on screen has been done by a Pakistani." He further said, "We purchased a new Alexa camera for the film; this is the first Pakistani film to have been shot on it. We just got our sound engineering done from India, but everything else has been done by us". Filming wrapped up in May 2017. "We spent close to []", the director revealed at a blogger's meeting, "film's budget is also a lot bigger than the market but we are trying to make big films, to keep increasing the benchmark."

Release
The film had a premiere event on 26 August in The O2 Arena, UK; where it released on 31 August. It then also premiered in Karachi Nuplex Cinema on 31 August. The film released on the festival of Eid al-Adha, 2 September 2017.

Box office
In its fifth weekend, the film collected . As of December 2017 The film collected has Rs 210 crores locally.

Critical response
Rahul Aijaz of The Express Tribune rated the film 3 out of 5 stars as he felt he had seen the "film a hundred times already", commenting "no matter how funny it is, that edge is lost".

Omair Alavi of Samaa TV said that the similar "may have happened before on screen but not in Pakistan". According to him, its "full-of-pun script" is the best part, while the negative part is that the plot "revolves around the commode". He felt that role of Urwa Hocane, Hania Amir and Marina Khan didn't manage to impress.

Sonia Ashraf of Dawn Images praised the cinematography, but thought that the "script was the film's weakest link". She said, "The film could have easily been made in Pakistan… Despite it needing to be shorter, it was enjoyable."

Khurram Zaidi of Dunya News commented, "a combination of solid comedy, fine action sequences and firm enough story to take it forward".

Accolades

Broadcast rights
The broadcast rights of the film were sold to Urdu1 & Star Gold Middle East .

Online streaming
The streaming rights of the movie were sold to Amazon Prime Video.

Controversy
The film was also scheduled to release in UAE on 31 August, but it was banned by UAE film censor board. Producer Fizza Ali Meerza said to Dawn Images that this ban "will not affect [their] ways of saying things". She added, "We believe in commenting on social issues in our films".

After a month of run, Punjab Film Censor Board too issued a notification against the film, that calls for its suspension in Punjab theatres, citing "persistent complaints from different quarters" as its reason. Director Nabeel Qureshi commented on this matter to Dawn Images, saying the film "already received clearance by the censor board and" released with no issues, "then ban it a month later sets a really bad precedent." "Also, the censor board issued the notification on a weekend so I couldn't even go to court to challenge immediately," he added, saying he will take the matter to the court anyway. However, the film was reviewed again and ban was lifted shortly on 7 October with no issues. Producer said in a press, "we have suffered losses because of this sudden ban." She added, "If they are going to ban films without solid justification, it's going to affect everyone involved in Pakistani cinema."

Soundtrack

A promotional music video "Heerey", starring Mohsin Abbas Haider, was released on 16 September. It was directed by Kamran Lodhi, while videography was done by Faraz Ahmed Sheikh. The soundtrack album was released by Filmwala Pictures on 7 August 2017 via online musical platform Taazi.

See also
 Na Maloom Afraad (film series)
 List of Pakistani films of 2017

References

External links

2017 films
2010s comedy thriller films
2010s Urdu-language films
Films set in Cape Town
Films shot in South Africa
Films shot in Karachi
Pakistani comedy thriller films
2010s crime comedy films
2017 comedy films
Fox Star Studios films